Maria Rosa Francisca Catalina Gil-Eigenmann y Castellvi (born March 9, 1942), also known professionally as Rosemarie Gil, is a Filipino actress and singer. She is best known for her portrayal of rich socialite-villainess roles.

Early life
Gil was born in Quiapo, Manila to Carlos Gil Jr. and Maria Dolores Castellvi. Her family owned a hacienda in Porac, Pampanga. She was educated at the elite Assumption Convent (now Assumption College).

Career
Premiere Productions gave her the title role in her first movie Sta. Rita De Casia (Patrona ng Imposible) (1958). She starred in Night of the Cobra Woman (1972) and Naked Vengeance (1985), among others.

Gil married fellow actor-musician Eddie Mesa in 1958, putting her stardom on hold, while her husband enjoyed a career in the limelight. The couple would eventually settle in the United States, separate and then reconcile.

She reclaimed her stardom in the 1970s upon her return, and starred in movies for international release. Her most remarkable film in the '70s was Burlesk Queen, co-starring Vilma Santos, which scored her numerous awards. Throughout the 1980s and 1990s, Gil often appeared in drama films and teleseryes.

After leaving showbiz in 2004, Gil returned to acting in 2018.

Personal life
She is married to her movie loveteam partner Eddie Mesa. The couple have three children who also became award-winning thespians Michael De Mesa, Mark Gil and Cherie Gil.

Awards and nominations
1982 Nominated FAMAS Award Best Supporting Actress Dear Heart (1981)
1978 Nominated FAMAS Award Best Supporting Actress Burlesk Queen (1977)
1978 Nominated Gawad Urian Award Best Supporting Actress Burlesk Queen (1977)
1977 Won Metro Manila Film Festival Best Supporting Actress Burlesk Queen (1977)
1974 Nominated FAMAS Award Best Supporting Actress Florinda (1973)

Filmography

Television
Kapwa Ko Mahal Ko (TV programme; 1975)
Cebu (TV mini-series) (1992)
Bisperas ng Kasaysayan (TV mini-series) (1994)
Anna Karenina (TV series) (1996) as Doña Carmela Cruz-Monteclaro
May Bukas Pa (TV series; 1999-2001) as Rodora Suarez
Noriega: God's Favorite (TV movie) (2000)
Sa Puso Ko, Iingatan Ka (TV series; 2001) as Emilia Villamines
Hiram (TV series; 2004) as Doña Carolina Verdadero
Ngayon at Kailanman (TV series; 2018) as Doña Carmen Alipio-Cortes

Movies

Magkapatid (2002)
Pagdating ng Panahon (2001)
Minsan Minahal Kita (2000)
Wansapanataym (1999) as Doña Tisay Enrique
Lea's Story (1998)
Sa Aking Mga Kamay (1996)
Di Mapigil ang Init (1995)
Paniwalaan Mo (1993)
Lessons in Love (1990)
Anak ni Zuma (1987)
Yesterday, Today and Tomorrow (1986)
Hello Lover, Goodbye Friend (1985) as Carlota "Lota" Delgado
Pati Ba Pintig ng Puso? (1985)
Shake, Rattle & Roll (1984)
Hindi Mo Ako Kayang Tapakan (1984) as Monica Tuazon
Friends in Love (1983)
Hindi Kita Malimot (1982) as Doña Teresa
Zimatar (1982)
Dear Heart (1981)
Nympha (1980)
4 Na Maria (1980)
Kadete (1979)
Arnis (1979)
Tonyong Bayawak (1979)
Halik sa Paa, Halik sa Kamay (1979)
Okey Lang, Basta't Kapiling Kita (1979)
Huwag Kang Malikot (1978)
Burlesk Queen (1977)
Kung Bakit May Ulap ang Mukha ng Buwan (1976)
Tatak ng Alipin (1975)
Mag-ingat Kapag Biyuda Ang Umibig (1975)
Biyenan Ko ang Aking Anak (1974)
Manda (Snakewoman) versus Kung Fu (1974) - released internationally as "Bruka, Queen of Evil"
Pepeng Agimat (1973)
Kill the Pushers (1972)
Pagdating sa Dulo (1971)
Avenida Boy (1971)
Mga Hagibis (1970)
Dugo ng Bayani (1969)
Krusaldo (1961)
Hawaiian Boy (1959)
Aawitan Kita (1959)
Sta. Rita De Casia (1958) -->

References

1942 births
Living people
Rosemarie
Filipino child actresses
Filipino film actresses
Filipino women comedians
People from Quiapo, Manila